Vehmaa is a municipality of Finland. It is located in the province of Western Finland and is part of the Southwest Finland region.

The municipality is unilingually Finnish.

Vehmaa is known of their red Granite Balmoral red, as well as being the birthplace of Albin Stenroos who won the gold medal in the marathon at the 1924 Olympics. According to Traficom, Vehmaa is the fifth most motorized municipality in Finland with 628 cars per 1000 inhabitants.

Vehmaa Church

The church of Vehmaa was probably built between in the 14th or 15th century. The pulpit was installed in the 17th century, and the other interior is from the 1840s. The church was dedicated to Saint Margaret.

References

External links

Municipality of Vehmaa – Official website 
Balmoral Red Fine Grain Granite

Municipalities of Southwest Finland
Populated coastal places in Finland
Populated places established in 1869
1869 establishments in the Russian Empire